Chrysaora pacifica, commonly named the Japanese sea nettle, is a jellyfish in the family Pelagiidae. This common species is native to the northwest Pacific Ocean, including Japan and Korea, but it was formerly confused with the larger and more northerly distributed C. melanaster. As a consequence, individuals kept in public aquariums have often been mislabelled as C. melanaster. Its sting is strong and can be dangerous to humans.

Functions
If the jellyfish sustained injuries, they would go through the process of symmetrization, in which they would restructure their figures by moving around existing parts and not recreating the ones lost to maintain balance.

References

Chrysaora
Animals described in 1886